Donato Gama da Silva (born 30 December 1962), known simply as Donato, is a Brazilian football manager and former player who played from the 1980s to early 2000s.

He spent most of his professional career in Spain – 15 years and more than 500 official games – most notably with Deportivo de La Coruña, being part of the Super Depor squads that won several major titles, including the 2000 La Liga championship. Having started his career as a central midfielder, he finished it as a central defender at almost 41. He was a strong but technical player, who was able both to destroy the opposition's attacks and to help generate his own team's.

Born in Brazil, Donato represented the Spain national team at Euro 1996.

Club career
Born in Rio de Janeiro, Donato began his 20-year professional career with America Football Club in his hometown, switching to neighbours CR Vasco da Gama in 1984 and playing there for the following four years, after which he joined Spain's Atlético Madrid as one of the first signings of elusive chairman Jesús Gil. With the Colchoneros, he won back-to-back Copa del Rey trophies.

Donato moved to Deportivo de La Coruña in 1993: alongside players like Bebeto, Mauro Silva, Miroslav Đukić and Fran, he was crucial to the team's firm establishment in both La Liga and European competitions, as he scored an impressive 18 league goals in his first two seasons combined, often from free kicks, one of his main assets. He continued to feature heavily for the Galicians in the following years, helping the club win two domestic cups and the historical 1999–2000 national championship (netting three times in 29 games).

In 2002, Donato broke a 43-year-old record by becoming the oldest goalscorer in Spain's top flight history. He also held the record for the most matches played in the country's top level by a player born outside of Spain, with 466 in 15 seasons.

Donato began his coaching career in Greece, as assistant manager at Aris Thessaloniki FC. In 2008, he was appointed youth team manager at lowly Montañeros CF in the A Coruña region.

On 5 November 2015, it was announced that Donato would take over as manager of Viveiro CF in the Galician regional championships.

International career
After becoming a citizen of Spain in 1990, Donato was called to the national team, and earned 12 caps in a two-year span. His debut arrived on 16 November 1994, starting and scoring in a 3–0 UEFA Euro 1996 qualifier win against Denmark at the Ramón Sánchez Pizjuán Stadium.

Subsequently, Donato was called up for the squad at the final stages in England, making a substitute appearance in their opening draw with Bulgaria at Elland Road.

International goals
Scores and results list Spain's goal tally first, score column indicates score after each Donato goal.

Honours
Atlético Madrid
Copa del Rey: 1990–91, 1991–92

Deportivo
La Liga: 1999–2000
Copa del Rey: 1994–95, 2001–02
Supercopa de España: 1995, 2000, 2002

See also
 List of Atlético Madrid players (+100)
 List of La Liga players (400+ appearances)
List of Spain international footballers born outside Spain

References

External links
 
 
 

1962 births
Living people
Brazilian emigrants to Spain
Footballers from Rio de Janeiro (city)
Brazilian footballers
Spanish footballers
Association football defenders
Association football midfielders
Association football utility players
Campeonato Brasileiro Série A players
America Football Club (RJ) players
CR Vasco da Gama players
La Liga players
Atlético Madrid footballers
Deportivo de La Coruña players
Spain international footballers
UEFA Euro 1996 players
Brazilian expatriate footballers
Expatriate footballers in Spain
Brazilian expatriate sportspeople in Spain
Brazilian football managers
Spanish football managers
Association football coaches
Naturalised citizens of Spain
Naturalised association football players